Isel is a dispersed settlement and area in the valley of the River Derwent within the Lake District National Park in Cumbria, England. It is an ecclesiastical parish within the civil parish of Blindcrake. Nearby are the hamlets of Setmurthy, Sunderland and Redmain, and the village of Blindcrake.

Isel is a rural community, with a church, a manorial Hall and several farms ranging from dairy to poultry, but lacking basic local facilities having no shop, public house or post office.  It is mentioned in the English folk song "Horn of the Hunter."

Isel Parish Church is dedicated to St Michael and the fabric is chiefly Norman. The church contains two pre-Norman carved stones, one of which is a fragment of a cross. Other buildings of interest are Isel Hall (with a pele tower), the ancient bridge of three arches (rebuilt in 1812) and the old vicarage.

Governance
Isel,  is part of the Workington constituency of the UK parliament. The current Member of Parliament is Sue Hayman, a member of the Labour Party. The Labour Party has won the seat in every general election since 1979; the Conservative Party has only been elected once in Workington since the Second World War: in the  1976 Workington by-election.

Prior to Brexit in 2020, residents in Isel voted to elect MEP's for the North West England constituency to the European Parliament.

For Local Government purposes it is in the All Saints Ward of Allerdale Borough Council and the Bothel + Wharrels Division of Cumbria County Council.

Isel has its own Parish Council; Blindcrake Parish Council.

See also

Listed buildings in Blindcrake

References

External links 
 Cumbria County History Trust: Blindcrake, Isel and Redmain (nb: provisional research only – see Talk page)
 Cumbria County History Trust: Isel Old Park (nb: provisional research only – see Talk page)

Villages in Cumbria
Allerdale